Providence Township was a township in what was then part of Chester County, Pennsylvania.  In 1687 it was split into Upper Providence and Nether Providence Townships.  Both Townships were in the area that split off of Chester County to form Delaware County in 1789.

Townships in Chester County, Pennsylvania
Former townships in Pennsylvania